Unlimited (stylized as UNLIMITED) is the debut studio album of Shouta Aoi and his second overall. The album was released on April 22, 2015.

Background and release

Unlimited is Shouta Aoi's debut studio album and the first under his voice acting stage name. The album compiles songs from his previous singles, "Virginal", "True Hearts", and "Himitsu no Kuchizuke", as well as his work in the stage play Margarita: Sengoku no Tenshi-tachi, along with seven new original songs. The album was released on April 22, 2015 under the B-green label. The album was also released in two different limited edition versions with alternate covers and DVD exclusives. The limited edition A version's DVD exclusive contains the music video for "Unlimited" and making-of footage, while the limited edition B's version includes a short documentary and a dance lesson for the choreography featured in "Unlimited."

Music

Aoi called the album his "crystal" and created it with an image of a "jewelry box", where each song was a "jewelry hunt", with listeners finding something new with every song. He worked with Elements Garden and requested them to produce songs where "multicolored gems would pop out when opened."

The album's title track, "Unlimited", was produced by Junpei Fujita and is a "digital-ic" dance tune that represents the key to Aoi's future activities. Aoi described the song as a duet with himself, where one side of him looks towards important events in the future while the other side of him looks at himself with a lack of self-confidence. The music video was shot over the course of two days and used four back-up dancers, two of whom previously appeared in the music video for "True Hearts." In the video, Aoi wore a costume he requested to contain the meaning of his past and future self. The dual concept also carried over to the CD cover shooting, where he is pictured "slowly removing" himself from his "past days."

Aside from seven new original songs, Unlimited also contained Aoi's singles previously released in 2014, including "Virginal", the ending theme song for Break Out; "True Hearts"; and "Himitsu no Kuchizuke." The album also contains Aoi's work in the stage play Margarita: Sengoku no Tenshi-tachi, with "Tenshi no Inori" was featured as the theme song as well as a CD version of the song "Sora wa Tomei na Chikai."

Reception

The album debuted at #7 in the Oricon Weekly Albums Chart and Billboard Japan Top Album Sales, charting for 5 weeks.

Track listing

Charts

Notes

References

Shouta Aoi albums
2015 albums